Noche Buena or Nochebuena may refer to:

Beverages and food
 Noche Buena, a Mexican beer from Cuauhtémoc Moctezuma Brewery
 Noche Buena, a cheese marketed by Sigma Alimentos

Other uses
 Nochebuena, Christmas Eve in Spanish-speaking countries and other places influenced by Spain
 Noche buena, Euphorbia pulcherrima or poinsettia